Mikro is a Greek band based in Thessaloniki, Greece. It was formed in 1998 and was named after the Greek word micro used in metric measuring systems. Their main focus is electronic music. In their releases they initially used an all-caps Greek spelling of their name (ΜΙΚΡΟ), however in their latest releases ("Restart", "Download", "Upload") they have switched to a non all-caps spelling, transliterated to the Latin Alphabet (Mikro).

The members are:
Nikos Bitzenis (Nikonn) (programming, loops, synths, vocals)
Chloe Ann (vocals, synths)
Yiannis Lefkaditis (John-John; guitar)
5irc (drums, loops, Vpads)

History
Nikos Bitzenis and Yiannis Leucaditis began experimenting with electropop music in the late 1990s having influences of the 1980s era such as Depeche Mode, Erasure, New Order and Duran Duran.
Later, Panos Tolios (of the Greek band Xylina Spathia ), George Costopoulos and Ria Mazine enter the group and their EP Stagones (Σταγόνες, Drops) goes out in 1998. After the production of the single Aspri Sokolata (Άσπρη Σοκολάτα, White Chocolate), Panos Tolios and George Costopoulos leave the group and Stelios Emmanuelidis gets in, forming Mikro as of today.

Discography
To Telos tou Kosmou (Το Τέλος Του Κόσμου, The End of the World) 1999
E-mail (Original soundtrack for the Greek movie of the same name) 2001
Tronik*plasma (Tronik*πλάσμα) 2003
Only the Best (Best of) 2004
180 Mires (180 Μοίρες, 180 Degrees/Destinies) 2004
Restart 2007
Download 2009
Upload 2009
New  2014

They also released singles by the above albums, some of which being: Stagones (Σταγόνες, Drops), Aspri Sokolata (Άσπρη Σοκολάτα, White Chocolate), Domatio (Δωμάτιο, Room) and Netrino.

Solo works
Nikos Bitzenis' solo album was released in 2006 by the name Poladroid. It has a chill out tone in contrast to the band's groovy and uptempo style. Sunday, a single of Poladroid was used in the 9th edition of Buddha Bar's compilation albums.

Internet
Mikro has spread over the internet in various ways; They have a myspace profile and made available to the public their videoclips via their YouTube user account.

External links
 Official website
 Mikro's Youtube profile
 Undo Records website
 Mikro's Facebook site

Greek pop music groups
Greek electronic music groups
Musical groups from Thessaloniki